Netanel Ben Simon (born 26 May 1992) is an Israeli footballer. He plays as a left back for Ironi Nesher.

Club career

Beitar Jerusalem
Ben Simon made his debut with Beitar Jerusalem on 25 December 2011, of a league match against Hapoel Acre.

Hapoel Jerusalem
In the winter transfers of 2013–14, Ben Simon joined Hapoel Jerusalem.

Hapoel Migdal HaEmek
In September 2014 left Beitar Jerusalem and signed to Hapoel Migdal HaEmek. At Migdal HaEmek assisted 12 goals, and became important player at the club's squad.

Hapoel Acre
On 19 August 2015 signed to Hapoel Acre.

References

External links
 
 Profile page at Beitar Jerusalem's official site 

1992 births
Living people
Israeli footballers
Beitar Jerusalem F.C. players
Maccabi Ahi Nazareth F.C. players
Hapoel Jerusalem F.C. players
Hapoel Migdal HaEmek F.C. players
Hapoel Acre F.C. players
Hapoel Beit She'an F.C. players
Hapoel Asi Gilboa F.C. players
F.C. Tzeirei Kafr Kanna players
Maccabi Daliyat al-Karmel F.C. players
Ironi Tiberias F.C. players
Ironi Nesher F.C. players
Association football defenders
Israeli Premier League players
Liga Leumit players
Israeli people of Moroccan-Jewish descent
Footballers from Acre, Israel